Abdul Hadi bin Abdul Hamid @ Hamid (born 25 February 1987, Kuala Kedah) is a Malaysian footballer who last plays for Kedah as a goalkeeper.

Club career
Hadi, who is a football silver medalist of SUKMA 2006 has been promoted to the senior squad after Kedah coach Azraai Khor brought him in as backup for current number one goalkeeper Helmi Eliza. Azraai was forced to bring another goalkeeper after Megat Amir Faisal Al Khalidi Ibrahim left the club to join Selangor. He also a former member of Malaysia U-20 squad in 2005 until 2006.

A long time admirer of Superman character made his first team debut for Kedah in a Malaysia Super League match against Perak on 3 January 2007 after Helmi Eliza has been sent off which Kedah won the match with 4–3 result at their own ground, Darulaman Stadium.

Kedah FA Coaching Career
On 28 November 2019, following his retirement on football career, Hadi due to joining Kedah FA coaching team management and he was appointed as assistant goalkeeping coach for 2020 Malaysia Super League seasons.

International career
For international appearance, Hadi earned his first call-up in 2005 to the Malaysia U-20 squad alongside Baddrol Bakhtiar, Mohd Khyril Muhymeen Zambri, Muhammad Shafiq Jamal, Mohd Bunyamin Umar, Mohd Sabre Mat Abu and became a first choice goalkeeper of K. Rajagopal's side. He made his full major international debut in AFC Youth Championship 2006 qualifying round on 12 December 2005 against Myanmar at Kuala Lumpur as Malaysia beat Myanmar 4-2.

Career statistics

Club

Honours

Club
Kedah
 Malaysia Super League (2): 2006–2007, 2007–2008
 FA Cup Malaysia (4): 2007, 2008,  2017,  2019
 Malaysia Cup (3): 2007, 2008, 2016
 Malaysia Premier League (2): 2005–06, 2015
 Malaysia Charity Shield : 2017

References

External links

1987 births
Living people
Malaysian footballers
Kedah Darul Aman F.C. players
People from Kedah
Malaysian people of Malay descent
Association football goalkeepers